The Secret of an Old Attic (Tajna starog tavana) is a Croatian children's film directed by Vladimir Tadej. It was released in 1984.

External links
 
 Croatian film archive: List of Croatian films from 1944 to 2006

1984 films
1980s Croatian-language films
Yugoslav children's films
Croatian children's films